Aston Cross may refer to:
part of Aston, Birmingham, West Midlands
Aston Cross, Ashchurch, Gloucestershire